Reso can signify multiple things:

 Raisio (Reso in Swedish), a city in southwestern Finland
 RÉSO, the current name for Montreal's underground city
 A nickname for the resonator guitar
 Jason Reso (born 1973), Canadian professional wrestler better known as Christian Cage or Christian